Gustave Viaud (April 25, 1836 – March 10, 1865) was a French naval surgeon born in Rochefort, Charente-Maritime on 25 April 1836 and died off Ceylon, present-day Sri Lanka, on 10 March 1865.

Biography 
Viaud was the elder brother of the writer Pierre Loti. He arrived in Tahiti in 1859 and worked in Taravao and the nearby islands, becoming the first photographer of Tahiti. Viaud had a camera that required very long exposure times of between 5 and 15 minutes, which forced him to take only landscapes. Gustave Viaud left 25 photographs of Papeete which constitute as many historical documents. He left Tahiti in 1862 before being appointed to Cochinchina.

The International Hydrographic Organization named Viaud Ridge after him in 1993. The ridge is an underwater mountain range in the Indian Ocean, located near where he died and where he was submerged the day after his death.

Bibliography 

 Dictionnaire illustré de la Polynésie, 4 vol, Editions de l'Alizé, 1988 
 Numa Broc, Dictionnaire des Explorateurs français du XIXE siècle, T.4, Océanie, CTHS, 2003, p. 376 

French military doctors
History of French Polynesia
French photographers
French surgeons
1836 births
1865 deaths